Admiral Sir Herbert Leopold Heath,  (27 December 1861 – 22 October 1954) was Second Sea Lord and Chief of Naval Personnel in the Royal Navy.

Military career
Born the son of Vice Admiral Sir Leopold Heath and educated at Brighton College, Heath was commissioned into the Royal Navy in 1874. In 1877 he took part in an engagement with the Peruvian rebel ship Huáscar. He was on board the battleship, HMS Victoria, when it was involved in a collision with the battleship, HMS Camperdown, and sank in 1893 with the loss of 372 lives. He led a party that tried to patch the hole in Victoria, but the ship was sinking too quickly for repairs.

He was promoted Captain on 1 January 1902, and later that year appointed Assistant-Director of Naval Intelligence at the Admiralty. In 1904 he was made commanding officer of the torpedo boat depot ship, HMS Vulcan, in the Mediterranean. Later he commanded the battleship, HMS Repulse, and the cruiser, HMS Lancaster. In 1908 he became naval attaché in Berlin. In 1910 he took command of the battleship, HMS Superb and around this time he was appointed the Naval Aide-de-Camp to the King. In 1912 he was appointed Admiral-Superintendent of Portsmouth Dockyard remaining in that post until 1914.

He served in World War I and in 1915 took command of the Second Cruiser Squadron of the Grand Fleet and as such he was the senior admiral of the cruiser line at the Battle of Jutland in May 1916. In November 1916 he was appointed to the command of the 3rd Battle Squadron.

In 1917 he became Second Sea Lord and Chief of Naval Personnel. After the War he was made Commander-in-Chief, Coast of Scotland. He retired in 1922.

Family
In 1891 he married Elizabeth Catherine Simson and they went on to have two daughters.

Honours and awards
 Knight Commander of the Order of the Bath
 Member of the Royal Victorian Order
 Commander of the Legion of Honour (France)
 Grand Cordon of the Order of the Rising Sun (Japan)
 Navy Distinguished Service Medal (United States)

References

External links
 
 Biography of Adm Sir Herbert Leopold Heath in the JJ Heath-Caldwell family history website

|-

|-

|-

|-

1861 births
1954 deaths
People educated at Brighton College
Knights Commander of the Order of the Bath
Members of the Royal Victorian Order
Foreign recipients of the Distinguished Service Medal (United States)
Commandeurs of the Légion d'honneur
Grand Cordons of the Order of the Rising Sun
Lords of the Admiralty
Royal Navy admirals of World War I
British naval attachés
Recipients of the Navy Distinguished Service Medal